Christopher David Gardner (born July 13, 1959) is an American nutrition researcher. He is the director of nutrition studies at the Stanford Prevention Research Center and the Rehnborg Farquhar Professor of Medicine at Stanford University.

Gardner is involved with the American Diabetes Association (ADA) and the American Heart Association (AHA). In 2019, he was co-author of updated nutrition guidelines for the ADA. He served as a member of the AHA’s Nutrition Committee from 2009 to 2013, and in 2020 he was appointed as a member of the AHA Lifestyle & Metabolic Health Council, and to a leadership position in the AHA Nutrition Committee (2020-2026).

Early life and education
Gardner was born on July 13, 1959, in Washington, D.C. After earning his Bachelor of Arts degree in philosophy from Colgate University, he spent two years completing undergraduate science courses at the University of California, Davis and the University of California, Berkeley to qualify for a master’s degree program in nutrition. Upon becoming eligible, he was accepted into the PhD program of Nutrition Science at the University of California, Berkeley.

Career
Upon completing his PhD and postdoctoral fellowship at Stanford University, Gardner accepted a position at the institution. As an assistant research professor of medicine, Gardner collaborated with John W. Farquhar to study the effectiveness of ginkgo biloba supplements to treat peripheral artery disease. The following year, he received a grant from the National Institutes of Health to study whether fresh garlic and garlic supplements lower cholesterol. As an assistant professor of medicine at the Stanford Prevention Research Center, Gardner led the first independent, long-term, head-to-head assessment of raw garlic and garlic supplements. He also oversaw the largest and longest-ever comparison of Atkins, Zone, LEARN or Ornish diets to see which led to the greatest weight loss and changes in cardiometabolic risk factors. A follow-up to this study was the DIETFITS trial that compared a Healthy Low-Fat to a Healthy Low-Carbohydrate study with over 600 women and men. This landmark study tested whether there is a predisposition to success on one diet or the other based on either a potential genetic pattern or a metabolic condition known as insulin resistance.

Gardner teaches a basic Human Nutrition class (HumBio 130), a Food and Society class (HumBio 166), and a Healthy and Sustainable Food Systems class (HumBio 113S) at Stanford. From 2010 and 2015, he convened a series of annual Stanford Food Summits that involved faculty, students and researchers from across Stanford’s seven schools. These interests led him to be invited to join the Scientific Advisory Board of the Menus of Change, a collaboration between The Culinary Institute of America and Harvard T.H. Chan School of Public Health’s Nutrition Department. He is also the co-founder of a spin-off of this group, the Menus of Change University Research Collaborative, a group of colleges and universities using campus dining halls as living laboratories to explore opportunities to make changes in eating patterns at those institutions. These activities have led to research studies and publications. In 2019, Gardner collaborated with a research team that included a food business consultant, an environmental scientist and a botanist to publish a review of protein requirements, current intakes, and potential beneficial impacts on the environment that would be realized in the US if protein intakes were lowered and shifted toward a more plant-based diet.

Gardner is involved with the American Diabetes Association (ADA) and the American Heart Association (AHA). In 2019, he was an invited co-author of updated nutrition guidelines for the ADA. He served as a member of the AHA’s Nutrition Committee from 2009 to 2013, and in 2020 he was appointed as a member of the AHA Lifestyle & Metabolic Health Council, and to a leadership position in the AHA Nutrition Committee.

Gardner was appointed the Rehnborg Farquhar Professor of Medicine at Stanford which supports research in disease prevention in June 2017. During the COVID-19 pandemic, Gardner found that replacing red meat with plant-based meat alternatives could lower some cardiovascular risk factors. He also grew his interests in microbiome by collaborating with Stanford microbiologists, Justin and Erica Sonnenburg, on several studies and with other microbiome researchers.

Personal life
Gardner and his wife Melissa, a political scientist, have four sons together and all follow a plant-based diet.

References

External links

Living people
1959 births
Stanford University faculty
Colgate University alumni
University of California, Berkeley alumni
University of California, Davis alumni
Nutritional scientists
Scientists from Washington, D.C.
Academics from Washington, D.C.